Kirkjubæjarklaustur (Icelandic for "church farm cloister", pronounced ; often referred to locally as just Klaustur) is a village in the south of Iceland on the hringvegur (road no. 1 or Ring Road) between Vík í Mýrdal and Höfn. It is part of the municipality of Skaftárhreppur and has about 500 inhabitants. It is surrounded by hills and plateaus to the north.

Location
Kirkjubæjarklaustur's geographical location makes it better known than other villages its size. It is the only place between Vík and Höfn which offers services, which includes a fuel station, a bank, a post office and a supermarket. Nearby tourist attractions include the Laki craters, the Eldgjá and Skaftafell, all in Vatnajökull National Park. An attraction close to the village is Kirkjugólf  ("Church floor"), a natural pavement of basalt. These are basalt columns in the earth, but only the tops can be seen, and as the name suggests, they have the appearance of a paved church floor. This lava formation has similar origins to the Giant's Causeway in Ireland.  All these attractions contribute to Kirkjubæjarklaustur being a popular stopping point for tourists.

History 
Even before the time of the first Norse settlement in Iceland, Irish monks are thought to have lived here. Since 1186, a well known convent of Benedictine nuns, Kirkjubæjar Abbey, was located in Kirkjubæjarklaustur, until the Reformation in 1550. The names of the waterfall Systrafoss ("waterfall of the sisters") and of the lake Systravatn  ("water of the sisters") on the highland above the village refer to this abbey. Folk tales illustrate the history with stories about good and sinful nuns. The Systrastapi  (sister's rock) is where two of the convent's nuns were buried after being burned at the stake. One of the nuns was accused of selling her soul to the Devil, carrying Communion bread outside the church, and having carnal knowledge with men; the other was charged with speaking blasphemously of the Pope. After the Reformation, the second sister was vindicated, and flowers are said to bloom on her grave, but not that of the first nun. Systravatn also has a legend relating to the convent. According to the English text on the Katla Geopark sign next to the lake, the nuns frequently bathed in the lake, and one day two nuns saw a hand holding a gold comb reach out from the water. When they tried to seize the comb, they were dragged below the water and drowned.

The village became well known in Iceland during the Lakagígar volcano eruptions in 1783. The pastor of the local church and dean of Vestur-Skaftafellssýsla,  (1728 – 1791), delivered what became known as the "Fire Sermon" (eldmessu ) on July 20, 1783. The legend says that this sermon stopped the lava flow, and the village was spared at the last moment. The current church, constructed in 1974, was built in memory of Rev. Jón.

Today, the village is an important service center for the farms in the region as well as for tourists and weekend visitors.  Many people from Reykjavík, the country's capital, have weekend huts by a nearby lake.

Climate 
Kirkjubæjarklaustur has a subarctic climate according to the koppen-geiger classification with warm, short summers and long, mild winters.

See also
List of settlements in Iceland
History of Iceland
Kirkby, a place name in England with a parallel etymology and meaning

References

Further reading
The Rough Guide to Iceland. Rough Guides, 2001.

External links

Official site (Icelandic)
ExploreIceland.is

Populated places in Southern Region (Iceland)
History of Christianity in Iceland